Athina Douka (born 18 November 1976 in Eleusis) is a Greek female sport shooter. At the 2012 Summer Olympics, she competed in the Women's 10 metre air pistol.

References

Sports Reference

1976 births
Living people
Greek female sport shooters
Olympic shooters of Greece
Shooters at the 2012 Summer Olympics
Sportspeople from Elefsina